Erika Tatiana Camacho is a Mexican-born American mathematical biologist and professor of applied mathematics at Arizona State University.
She is a 2014 Presidential Award for Excellence in Science, Mathematics, and Engineering Mentoring (PAESMEM) awardee. She was taught and mentored in high school by Jaime Escalante, who was the subject of the movie Stand and Deliver.

Education
Camacho was born September 3, 1974 in Guadalajara, Mexico. She attended high school at Garfield High School from 1990–1993 where she was taught by Jaime Escalante.  After graduating from Wellesley College, cum laude, with Bachelor of Arts degrees in mathematics and economics in 1997, she went to earn a PhD in applied mathematics from Cornell University in 2003 for her research on mathematical models of retinal dynamics.

Career 
After spending a year as a postdoc at Los Alamos National Laboratory, Camacho joined the faculty of the Department of Mathematics at Loyola Marymount University in 2004. She co-founded and co-directed the summer Research Experiences for Undergraduates, the Applied Mathematical Sciences Summer Research Institute (AMSSI), that ran from 2005–2007 with support from the National Science Foundation and the National Security Agency. Her research focuses on mathematical models of photoreceptors in the retina. In 2007, she moved to Arizona State University where she is a professor of applied mathematics. In 2013–2014, she taught at MIT in the MLK Visiting Scholars program.  She has served on numerous national boards including the Council of the American Mathematical Society (AMS), the Advisory Board of National Institute for Mathematical and Biological Synthesis (NIMBioS), and SACNAS Board of Directors.

In September 2019 she began a 3-year rotation as a Program Director with the National Science Foundation.  She was co-lead of the HSI Program and worked with the ADVANCE Program.  She also served as a Program Director in the Racial Equity in STEM Program Description where she and the other Program Directors were awarded a 2022 Director’s Award for Superior Accomplishment: "For excellence, inclusion, collaboration, integrity, learning, transparency, and public service in creating and bringing to fruition the EHR Racial Equity in STEM Education Program Description, a timely idea whose impact may fundamentally change the scientific endeavor and NSF."

In January 2023, she began a Fulbright Scholar Award at the Institut de la Vision in Paris (Sorbonne University). 

She is a staunch advocate for inclusivity in STEM.

Awards
Camacho is the recipient of the American Association for the Advancement of Science's 2019 Mentor Award and a 2014 Presidential Award for Excellence in Science, Mathematics, and Engineering Mentoring (PAESMEM), awarded for her research with and mentoring of undergraduates. In 2023 she received the M. Gweneth Humphreys Award in recognition of mathematics educators who have exhibited outstanding mentorship  and in 2020 she received the Louise Hay Award for Mathematics Education, both from the Association for Women in Mathematics. She won the 2020 SACNAS Presidential Service Award, the 2018 American Association of Hispanics in Higher Education (AAHHE) Outstanding Latino/a Faculty in Higher Education Research/Teaching (Research Institutions) Award, the 2017 HENAAC Education Award, the 2012 SACNAS Distinguished Undergraduate Institution Mentor Award, and the 2011 Hispanic Women's Corporation National Latina Leadership Award.

References

External links
VME TV, in Spanish
Camacho Discusses Applied Mathematics & Real-World Problems
LATMATH: Modeling Photoreceptor Death and Rescue

1974 births
Living people
20th-century American mathematicians
American women mathematicians
Arizona State University faculty
American people of Mexican descent
21st-century American mathematicians
Wellesley College alumni
Cornell University alumni
People from Guadalajara, Jalisco
20th-century American women
21st-century American women